|}

This is a list of electoral district results for the 1924 Victorian state election.

Results by electoral district

Abbotsford

Albert Park 

 Two party preferred vote was estimated.

Allandale

Ballarat East

Ballarat West

Barwon

Benalla

Benambra

Bendigo East

Bendigo West

Boroondara

Borung

Brighton 

 Oswald Snowball was the sitting Nationalist MP for Brighton.

Brunswick

Bulla

Carlton

Castlemaine and Maldon

Collingwood

Dalhousie

Dandenong 

 Two party preferred vote was estimated.

Daylesford

Dundas

Eaglehawk

East Melbourne

Essendon

Evelyn 

 William Everard was the sitting Nationalist MP for Evelyn.

Fitzroy

Flemington

Geelong

Gippsland East

Gippsland North 

 Two candidate preferred vote was estimated.

Gippsland South

Gippsland West

Glenelg 

 Two party preferred vote was estimated.

Goulburn Valley

Grenville 

 Two party preferred vote was estimated.

Gunbower 

 Henry Angus was the sitting Nationalist MP for Gunbower.

Hampden

Hawthorn 

 Two party preferred vote was estimated.

Jika Jika

Kara Kara

Korong

Lowan

Maryborough

Melbourne

Mornington

North Melbourne

Ovens 

 Alfred Billson was the sitting Nationalist MP for Ovens.

Polwarth

Port Fairy

Port Melbourne

Prahran 

 Two party preferred vote was estimated.

Richmond

Rodney

St Kilda

Stawell and Ararat

Swan Hill 

Two party preferred vote was estimated.

Toorak

Upper Goulburn

Walhalla

Wangaratta

Waranga

Warrenheip

Warrnambool 

 Two candidate preferred vote was estimated.

Williamstown

See also 

 1924 Victorian state election
 Candidates of the 1924 Victorian state election
 Members of the Victorian Legislative Assembly, 1924–1927

References 

Results of Victorian state elections
1920s in Victoria (Australia)